New Party (Nova) was a liberal political party in Serbia. It was founded in 2013 by Zoran Živković, the former Prime Minister of Serbia and former member of the Democratic Party, and was most recently led by Aris Movsesijan.

History
Established in early 2013, the party advocates close ties to the western powers and European integration. The party contested the 2014 parliamentary election as part of a wider coalition of moderate parties led by the Democratic Party. It formed a coalition with the Social Democratic Party led by former President of Serbia Boris Tadić for the 2022 general election. In late April 2022, Movsesijan stepped down as party leader. A month later, the party left the Liberal South East European Network.

In July 2022, New Party merged with "Da se struka pita", in order to form New Party–D2SP.

Presidents of the New Party

Electoral results

Parliamentary elections

Presidential elections

External links

References

2013 establishments in Serbia
Centrist parties in Serbia
Liberal parties in Serbia
Political parties established in 2013
Pro-European political parties in Serbia
Social liberal parties
2022 disestablishments in Serbia
Political parties disestablished in 2022
Democratic Party (Serbia) breakaway groups